A slow dance is a type of partner dance in which a couple dance slowly, swaying to the music. This is usually done to very slow-beat songs, namely sentimental ballads.

Slow dancing can refer to any slow couple dance (such as certain ballroom dances), but is often associated with a particular, simple style of dance performed by middle school, high school, and college students.

Technique
When two partners dance together, the male partner typically holds his hands against the sides of the female partner's hips, buttocks, or waist while the female drapes her hands on the male's shoulders. The couple then sways back and forth with the music. Foot movement is minimal, but the pair may use their feet to slowly turn on the spot. Because the dance requires little physical concentration, participants often talk to each other while dancing. Some couples who have a close relationship may dance very closely together, in a "hug-and-sway" fashion.

References

Partner dance
Dance culture